Bratz (also known as Bratz: The Movie) is a 2007 American comedy film based on the fashion doll toyline of the same name from MGA Entertainment. The film is directed by Sean McNamara with a screenplay by Susan Estelle Jansen, from a story written by Adam de la Pena and David Eilenberg. It is the first live-action film based on the toyline after a series of direct-to-video animated films and a television series.

Nathalia Ramos, Skyler Shaye, Logan Browning, and Janel Parrish star as the member of the group, with Chelsea Staub, Lainie Kazan, and Jon Voight in supporting roles. The story revolves around a group of four teenage girls, the origin of their friendship and the social pyramid that tries to make the Bratz conform to archetypal high school cliques. Principal photography took place in Los Angeles between February and March 2007.

Bratz was released in the United States on August 3, 2007, by Lionsgate. The film was panned by critics and received five nominations at the 28th Golden Raspberry Awards, including Worst Picture. It was also a commercial failure, grossing only $26 million worldwide against a $20 million budget, failing to break even.

Plot
Four teenage best friends, Cloe, Yasmin, Sasha and Jade, are about to start high school. Meredith, the extremely controlling student body president, wants everyone to belong to a clique, and goes about organizing students. She hates the independent spirit of the four girls and plots to destroy their friendship and make them conform to her pre-fabricated cliques.

Cloe is a soccer player. She meets Cameron and is instantly enamored, distancing herself from her friends. Sasha is recruited as a cheerleader. Jade joins the science club, then meets Dexter and discovers a passion for fashion design. Yasmin joins the journalism club, but later decides to focus on another passion: singing. Though the girls do try and make time for each other, they are all busy with their own respective cliques and new friends. Yasmin meets Dylan, a popular jock, who is deaf but can lip read, who misses being able to listen to music. The friends begin to drift apart as they are compelled to stay within their cliques due to Meredith's plans.

Two years later, when an accidental food fight causes them to get detention for breaking the Principal statue, they explain that they miss being BFF's and decide to be friends again. They also try to get the other schoolmates to socialize outside their cliques, but their attempts fail when Meredith's second "Super Sweet 16" party ends disastrously where she accidentally smothering by her own cake and falling into her own pool with her friends. Meredith tries blackmailing the girls by using an embarrassing photo to have them quit the talent show, which backfires as everyone shares their secrets.

The upcoming talent show and its scholarship prize gives them the idea to bring all the cliques together again with a musical number, but the chances are slim with Meredith's constant attempts to steal the spotlight. In the end, there is a tie. Meredith gets the trophy, but the girls also get the scholarship, which they give to Cloe instead. They are offered an appearance at a red carpet gala by an MTV vice president.

Cast

Production
Paula Abdul was dropped from the production before completion while working on American Idol. She was originally enlisted to provide wardrobe designs, choreograph the film, executive-produce, as well as hold a role in the film. This was revealed on Hey Paula, her reality show on her personal life.

Susie Singer Carter also wrote and produced the film for Lionsgate but lost her credit in a Writers Guild arbitration, then her name appears as screenwriter on the final movie poster.

The film was shot from February to March 2007 at Santee Education Complex in South Los Angeles, California, while in session.

Reception

Critical response
Bratz was universally panned by critics and fans alike. On Rotten Tomatoes, gives the film a rating of 10%, based on 80 reviews, with an average rating of 3.40/10. The site's critical consensus, "Full of mixed messages and dubious role-models, Bratz is too shallow even for its intended audience." On Metacritic, the film has  a score of 21 out of 100, based on 18 critics, indicating "generally unfavorable reviews". Audiences polled by CinemaScore gave the film an average grade of "B+" on an A+ to F scale.

Accolades

It was nominated for 5 Golden Raspberry Awards in 2007, but received none.
 Worst Picture (lost to I Know Who Killed Me) 
 Worst Actress for Logan Browning, Janel Parrish, Nathalia Ramos, and Skyler Shaye (lost as a tie to Lindsay Lohan in I Know Who Killed Me (as the characters of Aubrey and Dakota)
 Worst Supporting Actor for Jon Voight (lost to Eddie Murphy in Norbit (as the character of Mr. Wong)
 Worst Screen Couple for "Any combination of two totally airheaded characters" (lost to Lindsay Lohan ("as the yang to her own yin") in I Know Who Killed Me)
 Worst Remake or Rip-off ("a rip-off if there ever was one") (lost to I Know Who Killed Me)

Box office
Bratz grossed $10 million in North America and $16 million in other territories for a total gross of $26 million.

In its opening weekend, the film grossed $4.2 million, finishing in 10th at the box office, making it a box office bomb.

Home media 

The film was released to DVD on November 27, 2007.

Soundtrack

A film soundtrack entitled Bratz: Motion Picture Soundtrack was released on July 31, 2007, through Geffen Records. The soundtrack featured music from artists such as Ashlee Simpson, Dropping Daylight, and the Black Eyed Peas. Three singles were released prior to the album's release, "Rainy Day" by Janel Parrish, "Rockstar" by Prima J, and "Fearless" by Daechelle. 

Sales for the soundtrack were good and the album remained on the Billboard 200 charts for three weeks, peaking during its second week at position 83. Common Sense Media gave the soundtrack three stars, writing that "With heavy-hitting help from the Black Eyed Peas, The Slumber Party Girls, Ashlee Simpson, Dropping Daylight, and Lifehouse, these young performers gamely negotiate some very ordinary-sounding, preachy material and make the songs sparkle anyway." The 9th track on the album “Out from Under” was later covered by Britney Spears on her 6th studio album Circus.

Track list

Video game 

A video game adaptation of the film entitled Bratz 4 Real was released to the Nintendo DS and Microsoft Windows on November 5, 2007. The game was published by THQ.

The game's plot mirrored that of the film and players are tasked with completing goals and errands in order to progress the story along. The DS version of the game also allowed users to design their own clothes patterns, care for a digital pet, and play various mini-games. The PC edition also utilized mini-games, but excluded the option for players to design clothing or raise a digital pet. In both games users could play as one of the four main characters and view clips from the film.

Pocket Gamer heavily criticized the game and stated that it felt that it was released too early and that "There are some nice ideas at play, in particular where it attempts to break down the social barriers that beset children in secondary education, but as a game it's far too vacuous to recommend." IGN shared similar sentiments, writing that "Bratz 4 Real does some work to recast the shallow, self-absorbed Bratz girls in a more redeeming light, using them and their friendship to tell a tale of unity and breaking down social barriers. But whereas that premise and the game's compelling customization options prove to be solid positive points for this package, Bratz 4 Real is still a game brought down by a variety of other oddities."

See also
 List of American films of 2007

References

External links

 
 

Bratz
2007 films
2007 comedy films
2000s buddy comedy films
2000s female buddy films
2000s high school films
2000s musical comedy films
2000s teen comedy films
American buddy comedy films
American female buddy films
American high school films
American musical comedy films
American teen comedy films
American teen musical films
Brookwell McNamara Entertainment films
Crystal Sky Pictures films
2000s English-language films
Films about music and musicians
Films based on toys
Films directed by Sean McNamara
Films produced by Avi Arad
Films shot in Los Angeles
Lionsgate films
Live-action films based on animated series
Films based on fashion dolls
2000s American films